Miosiren is an extinct genus of manatee from the Early Miocene of southeastern England (Suffolk) and Antwerp, Belgium.
 
Two species are recognized, M. canhami and M. kocki.

Phylogeny
A 2014 cladistic analysis of extinct sirenians recovered Miosiren as a close relative of Anomotherium in a separate subfamily within Trichechidae, Miosireninae.

See also 
Evolution of sirenians

References

Neogene mammals of Europe
Miocene sirenians
Fossil taxa described in 1889
Prehistoric placental genera